Maughanasilly Stone Row is a stone row and National Monument located in County Cork, Ireland.

Location

Another stone circle is at Illane,  NNE of Maughanasilly.

History

Maughanasilly Stone Row was erected during the Bronze Age, c. 1600–1500 BC, making it contemporary with the Indo-Aryan migrations and the rise of Shang China, the New Kingdom of Egypt and Mycenaean Greece. It was used for archaeoastronomical purposes, for making observations of lunar standstills and equinoxes.

It was excavated in 1977 by Ann Lynch. Shallow pits were found with quartz pebbles scattered around. Two flint scrapers were also found.

Description

There are five standing stones and one prostrate stone, aligned approximate NE-SW.

References

National Monuments in County Cork
Archaeoastronomy
Archaeological sites in County Cork
16th-century BC works